Abdul Qahar Balkhi is an Islamic Emirate of Afghanistan official and the current spokesperson of the Ministry of Foreign Affairs of the Islamic Emirate of Afghanistan since 25 September 2021. He was designated as a member of the Taliban's Cultural Commission after the fall of Kabul until his exact role in the Taliban government was determined. He also served the Taliban media office in the early 2010s.

Balkhi first appeared publicly at the Taliban's first press conference on 17 August 2021, after the fall of Kabul. During the press conference, he interpreted for the spokesman Zabihullah Mujahid. On 22 August 2021, he was interviewed by Charlotte Bellis of Al Jazeera in the group's first official interview. During the interview, he thanked New Zealand for providing financial support to Afghanistan following the takeover, given their donations to the UN and Red Cross.

Video letter to US Congress 

On 17 November 2021, in an open letter addressed to US Congress, Taliban's acting foreign minister Amir Khan Muttaqi appealed to unfreeze Afghan central bank assets worth $US9 billion to avert a humanitarian catastrophe. Taliban's spokesperson Abdul Qahar Balkhi also tweeted a video recording of the letter, marking a new era in Taliban's Twitter diplomacy.

Personal life 
He is a former New Zealand resident, and some of his family still there. Balkhi speaks English.

See also 
 Ahmadullah Wasiq
 Suhail Shaheen
 Zabiullah Mujahid
 Tariq Ghazniwal

References

External links
 

Taliban leaders
Living people
1988 births